The 2019 New Zealand Women's Sevens Fast Four or Women's Fast Four was the inaugural women's sevens tournament held on 26–27 January 2019 at FMG Stadium Waikato, Hamilton alongside the 2019 New Zealand Sevens.

In August 2018, New Zealand Rugby announced the Black Ferns Sevens would play France, England and China at the Women's Fast Four. Each team played four matches a week before round three of the Sydney Women's Sevens in Sydney. Although the Black Ferns Sevens had previously played exhibition matches in New Zealand, the 2019 HSBC New Zealand Sevens was the first time the team had competed in an international tournament on home turf.

Format
Each team played four matches in Hamilton: three matches within a round-robin format followed by a final playoff match. The top two teams met in the gold medal match, with the bottom two playing for bronze.

The women's final matches were played directly before the men’s Cup final to complete the two days of competition at the 2019 New Zealand Sevens.

Teams
Four core teams from 2018–19 World Rugby Women's Sevens Series participated in the tournament:

Round-robin
All times in New Zealand Time (UTC+12:00)

Third place

Cup final

Tournament placings

Source: World Rugby

See also
2019 New Zealand Sevens
2018–19 World Rugby Women's Sevens Series
World Rugby

References

External links
 Tournament site
 World Rugby info

2019
Sevens Fast Four
2019 in women's rugby union
Women's Sevens
January 2019 sports events in New Zealand